WUWM (89.7 FM, "Milwaukee's NPR") is the flagship National Public Radio station in Milwaukee, Wisconsin. It is owned and operated by the University of Wisconsin–Milwaukee and licensed to the Board of Regents of the University of Wisconsin System.  A unit of the UW-Milwaukee College of Letters and Science, the station transmits from the WITI TV Tower in Shorewood, and is based on the seventh floor of Chase Tower in downtown Milwaukee, moving there from facilities in the nearby Shops of Grand Avenue in mid-January 2010.

WUWM airs programming from NPR, Public Radio International, American Public Media, and also airs BBC World Service in the overnight hours, with much of the weekend entertainment programming scheduled purposefully to avoid duplication with Wisconsin Public Radio's WHAD (90.7). WUWM also airs considerable amounts of local programming and also fills airtime with adult album alternative music, including a weekly program hosted by longtime Milwaukee radio personality (and early WUWM staff member) Bob Reitman called It's Alright Ma, It's Only Music.

Until December 2013, the station broadcast in HD Radio. It operated an automated AAA station on its second HD channel known as The Deuce.  The HD transmitter broke down in December 2013, and WUWM opted not to replace it due to lack of demand. According to the station's general manager at the time, Dave Edwards (who was also the chairman of the NPR board), the HD2 stream attracted very little listenership over the air, and only 200 listeners per week online. With little outside of a small jump in audio quality on the main signal to justify the technology, station officials concluded it was not worth the effort to bring the HD transmitter back online.

History
WUWM signed on the air in September 1964. Originally a student laboratory, it took on a more professional look with the formation of the Corporation for Public Broadcasting. It was a charter member of NPR in 1971, and remained independently operated from what was then known as the Wisconsin Educational Radio Network, even after the same year's merger of the Wisconsin State University system and the University of Wisconsin into the combined University of Wisconsin System.

However, its signal was largely limited to the area around the UW-Milwaukee campus and Milwaukee's East Side. That changed in 1978, when WITI donated space on its tower, giving it a fairly decent signal to Milwaukee itself and much of the metropolitan area.  It was originally limited to 1,500 watts due to a glut of stations on the lower end of the FM dial in the Chicago-Milwaukee-Madison axis. However, a change in FCC regulations gave priority to fully qualified public radio stations. It gradually increased its power to 15,500 watts, giving it a signal comparable to the other major stations in Milwaukee. It became an all-news station in 1988, predating the trend towards all-news programming on major-market NPR stations.

References

External links
WUWM official website

NPR member stations
UWM
Radio stations established in 1964
WUWM
Milwaukee County, Wisconsin
Public broadcasting in Wisconsin
UWM